William O'Donnell (born 30 June 1942) is a British former swimmer. He competed in the men's 100 metre freestyle at the 1960 Summer Olympics.

References

1942 births
Living people
British male swimmers
Olympic swimmers of Great Britain
Swimmers at the 1960 Summer Olympics
Sportspeople from Manchester
British male freestyle swimmers
20th-century British people